The Synod of Thurles, which took place in 1850, was the first formal synod of Catholic episcopacy and clergy since 1642. The cathedral church of the Roman Catholic Archdiocese of Cashel and Emly is located in Thurles. The Synod was called by Paul Cullen following his appointment as Archbishop of Armagh. The Synod took place in St. Patrick's College, Thurles, County Tipperary, Ireland. Proceedings commenced on Thursday, 22 August 1850.

The synod marked the beginning of a movement led by Cullen to standardise the administration, religious practices, teaching and discipline of the Catholic church in Ireland. Practices in the Church in Ireland had evolved differently from practices in continental Europe due to state suppression of the Church in Ireland from the c.1640 until Catholic emancipation in 1829. In advance of the synod, Cullen had been in Rome where he was appointed an Apostolic Delegate which in effect give him direct papal authority over the Catholic church in Ireland.  Cullen was an 'ultramontanist' in philosophy and was committed to bringing the church in Ireland into line with the church in Rome. In particular, Cullen was opposed to local or popular religious expression and interpretation; he was determined to end such practices in Ireland. The synod also occurred at a sensitive time following the devastation of the Great Irish famine. Counteracting proselytising efforts by the protestant churches were also discussed.

Along with the twenty seven bishops in attendance, the abbot of Mount Melleray Abbey, Dom Bruno Fitzpatrick was entitled to vote at the synod.

One of the main commitments from the Synod was to establish a Catholic University in Ireland in response to the establishment of the Queen's Colleges and the Queen's University of Ireland by the Universities Ireland Act of 1845 by the British Government. The bishops adopted the papal condemnation of the 'godless colleges' (i.e. the Queen's colleges) but were divided over priests accepting college positions and lay involvement.  The consequence was the Catholic University of Ireland established in 1851 and the invitation from the bishops to Cardinal John Henry Newman to become its chancellor and its foundation in 1854.

Decrees of the Plenary Synod of the Bishops of Ireland (Decreta Synodi Plenariae Episcoporum Hiberniae) was published in 1851 following the synod.

References

History of Catholicism in Ireland
Synods of Ireland